Format18 (F18) was a Russian neo-Nazi group based in the city of Moscow. It was led by Maxim Sergeyevich Martsinkevich (also known as Tesak), and had close relations with the political party National Socialist Society.

Background 
Format18 was initially formed under the name "Creative Studio Format-18" sometime during the end of 2005 in Moscow by Russian racist skinhead Maxim Martsinkevich. The number "18" in the group's name was selected as an alphanumeric code which corresponds to "AH", the initials of Adolf Hitler - with "A" being the 1st letter of the Latin alphabet and "H" being the 8th.

The site was initially intended as an internet forum for Russian neo-Nazis, but Martsinkevich and his fellow neo-Nazi associates eventually started to upload their own video blogs to the site that discussed the far-right subculture, weightlifting, and paramilitary training. They would also interview bystanders about their views on the presence of non-Slavic immigrants in the Russian Federation. Martsinkevich also published videos of him and other Russian white supremacists promoting hatred towards Afro-Russians and antifascists - sometimes portrayed in fictional acting scenarios.

Maxim Martsinkevich, along with many other individuals affiliated with Format18 had a reputation for recording numerous attacks and even some murders that were carried out on ethnic minorities, immigrants, non-Russians, transients, prostitutes, and similar victims alike. Additionally, its members would film humiliating interviews of their political opponents (typically militant antifascists, leftists, and homosexuals) while subjecting them to degradation and abuse. Videos featured on the F18 website were often sold and distributed by the group for profit. It was such types of controversial content that organization attracted widespread attention for.

A vast selection of far-right political music by various neo-Nazi bands and white power artists were also available for purchase. Many of these songs can be heard playing in the background of the videos that were uploaded.

Dissolution and legacy 
Format18 was officially designated as an extremist organization in late 2010 by the Moscow City Court which resulted in the banning of the group and removal of the format18.org website.

F18 are often credited with popularizing the trend of filming attacks on immigrants and subsequently uploading them to the internet, which has become a popular practice amongst Russian neo-Nazi circles.

Maxim Martsinkevich and Format18 are said to have been the inspiration behind the 2009 mockumentary film Russia 88.

The organization has been featured in several documentaries about neo-Nazis in Russia, including From Russia With Hate, Credit For Murder, and Ross Kemp on Gangs.

See also 

 Combat Terrorist Organization
 NS/WP Crew
 National Socialist Society
 The Savior (paramilitary organization)
 Primorsky Partisans

References

Further reading
Politics Russia, by Catherine Danks

External links 
Beheading and Shooting by Russian Neo-Nazis on Video, The New York Times, 15 August 2007
Format18 on anticompromat.ru 
Тесак затупился The New Times 9 July 2007 

Far-right politics in Russia
Neo-Nazi organizations
Neo-Nazism in Russia
Russian nationalist organizations